Keiko Nogami may refer to:

, Japanese long-distance runner
, Japanese sailor